The VanOpen, currently sponsored as Odlum Brown VanOpen, is a professional tennis tournament played on outdoor hardcourts. It is part of the Association of Tennis Professionals (ATP) Challenger Tour, and of the ITF Women's Circuit. It is held at Hollyburn Country Club in West Vancouver, British Columbia, Canada. The event was hosted continuously from 2002 to 2015, but returned in 2017 after a one-year hiatus.

History
The inaugural Odlum Brown VanOpen took place in the summer of 2002, in the Jericho Tennis Club, before it eventually moved to Hollyburn Country Club, in West Vancouver, for the 2005 edition. Started as a $25,000 ITF Women's Circuit event, the Van Open saw the victory of eventual world No. 1 Maria Sharapova over Laura Granville in 2002, and of then-Junior world No. 1 and French Open girls' singles champion Anna-Lena Grönefeld in 2003.

The following year, Tennis Canada and Tennis BC (tennis' governing body in British Columbia) joined to bring the event to the Women's Tennis Association (WTA) Tour as a $110,000 Tier V event. Czech qualifier, and eventual top-ten member Nicole Vaidišová won the singles final over 2002 runner-up Laura Granville, becoming, as World No. 180, the lowest-ranked player to win a tour title during the 2004 WTA Tour season, and at 15 years, 3 months, and 23 days, the sixth youngest player to win a professional title in tour history.

While the women's event returned to its $25k format in 2005, "to help develop some of the world's best Canadian junior girls", a $100k men's Challenger event was added to the tournament, with the United States Tennis Association (USTA) and the Association of Tennis Professionals (ATP Tour) joining Tennis Canada, Tennis BC and the ITF in the organisation of the Open. Israeli Dudi Sela won the inaugural men's singles event over Australian Paul Baccanello in straight sets, and American Ansley Cargill won the first of her two women's singles titles (2005, 2006).

The VanOpen continued to grow in the following editions, with the ITF event's prize money moving up to $50k in 2007, and $75k in 2009. Amongst the tournament's champions since 2005 have been, on the women's side, former junior world No. 1 Urszula Radwańska (2008 singles), Stéphanie Dubois (2007 doubles, 2009 singles), and on the men's side Rik de Voest (2006 singles, 2007 and 2009 doubles), Frédéric Niemeyer (2007 singles), Dudi Sela (2005, 2008 and 2010 singles), who claimed his second VanOpen title, and 2006 Australian Open runner-up Marcos Baghdatis (2009 singles), who won in Vancouver his first title since February 2007.

Past finals

Men's singles

Women's singles

Men's doubles

Women's doubles

References

External links
Official website

 
ATP Challenger Tour
ITF Women's World Tennis Tour
Tennis tournaments in Canada
Hard court tennis tournaments
Sport in Vancouver
Tennis in British Columbia
Recurring sporting events established in 2002
2002 establishments in British Columbia